This is the progression of world record improvements of the 1500 metres M75 division of Masters athletics.
Key

References

Masters Athletics 1500 m list

Masters athletics world record progressions